Percy Gott Barstow (23 October 1883 – 2 January 1969) was a Labour Party politician in Great Britain.

Biography 
Born in Pontefract, Barstow was educated at Leeds Higher Grade School, then followed his father in becoming an engine driver.  Unlike many engine drivers, he chose to join the National Union of Railwaymen (NUR), and from 1906 he worked full-time as a clerk at the union's headquarters.  In 1913, he was promoted to become a departmental manager at the union, then in 1934 became its office manager.

Barstow stood unsuccessfully in Barrow-in-Furness at the 1935 United Kingdom general election.  He was elected as Member of Parliament (MP) for Pontefract at the 1941 Pontefract by-election following the death of Adam Hills.  He was elected unopposed and held the seat until the 1950 General Election.

Percy Barstow entered the House of Commons on 29 July 1941, and made his maiden speech during the War Situations Debate on 25 February 1942.

References

External links 
 

1883 births
1969 deaths
Labour Party (UK) MPs for English constituencies
National Union of Railwaymen-sponsored MPs
UK MPs 1935–1945
UK MPs 1945–1950
Politicians from Pontefract